The 2011 Liga de Voleibol Superior Femenino is the 43rd official season of Liga de Voleibol Superior Femenino (English: Female Superior Volleyball League). The 2011 season was dedicated to Ángel Rivero. In early May, the President of the Puerto Rican Volleyball Federation announced that the Champion from the 2011 LVSF tournament will be the NORCECA representative at the 2011 FIVB Women's Club World Championship.

Competing Teams

Regular season
As of the end of the regular season, April 10, 2011.

Statistics

Scorers

Spikers

Blockers

Servers

Receivers

Setters

Diggers

Liberos

Awards

Voting Awards
Most Valuable Player
 Criollas de Caguas

Best Setter
 Vaqueras de Bayamón

More Progress Player
 Criollas de Caguas

Rookie of the Year
 Vaqueras de Bayamón

Coach Of the Year
 Javier Gaspar Mets de Guaynabo

Chairman Of the Year
 Francisco Ramos Criollas de Caguas

Statistics Awards
According to league statistics at the end of the regular season.

Best Scorer
 Criollas de Caguas
Best Spiker
 Criollas de Caguas
Best Blocker
 Llaneras de Toa Baja
Best Server
 Criollas de Caguas
Best Setter
 Vaqueras de Bayamón
Best Digger
 Criollas de Caguas
Best Receiver
 Llaneras de Toa Baja
Best Libero
 Criollas de Caguas

Quarterfinals
As of the end of quarterfinals, April 26, 2011.

Group A

Group B

Semifinals

Group A

Results
Game 1. April 29, 2011

|}

Game 2. April 30, 2011

|}

Game 3. May 2, 2011

|}

Game 4. May 4, 2011

|}

Group B

Results
Game 1. April 28, 2011

|}

Game 2. April 30, 2011

|}

Game 3. May 2, 2011

|}

Game 4. May 3, 2011

|}

Final

Standing

Results
Game 1. May 8, 2011

|}

Game 2. May 10, 2011

|}

Game 3. May 12, 2011

|}

Game 4. May 14, 2011

|}

Awards
Final Series Most Valuable Player
 Criollas de Caguas

References

External links
 League Website

PUR
Volleyball competitions in Puerto Rico
2011 in Puerto Rican sports